Dorothy Walker (March 21, 1899 – August 1, 1983) was an American lawyer who served as the first female district attorney in Wisconsin.

Walker was born on March 21, 1899 in Columbus, Wisconsin. In 1921, she was the only female to graduate in her class from the University of Wisconsin Law School. Upon being admitted to practice law in Wisconsin in February 1922, Walker thereafter worked as a partner for a law firm until being elected District Attorney of Columbia County. By 1938, after serving two terms as district attorney, Walker opened her own private practice. In 1974, she was the first female to receive the Distinguished Alumni Faculty Award from the UW Law School Alumni Association. She died on August 1, 1983 at her law office in her hometown.

See also 

 List of first women lawyers and judges in Wisconsin

References 

Wisconsin lawyers
University of Wisconsin Law School alumni
1899 births
1983 deaths
People from Columbus, Wisconsin
20th-century American lawyers
20th-century American women lawyers